The  was a multiple train crash which occurred on 3 May 1962 near Mikawashima Station in Arakawa, Tokyo, Japan. It involved a freight train and two passenger trains; 160 people were killed.

First train
At 21:36, a Mito-bound freight train (No. 287) was approaching to join the main Jōban Line at Mikawashima Station and missed the red signal. A fail-safe mechanism diverted the freight train onto a safety siding, preventing a devastating head-on collision, however the freight train was travelling too fast and derailed in the siding, leaving the locomotive and leading tanker-wagon obstructing the main line.

Second train
The passengers used the emergency escape handles and started walking back to the station. The operators in the nearby signal box were too busy dealing with the aftermath of the first collision and failed to notify other traffic on the line.

Third train
Six minutes after the first collision, an incoming passenger train (2000H) collided with the derailed 2117H and hit many of the passengers escaping from the first collision. The first carriage was smashed and the next three derailed, resulting in 160 deaths and 296 injuries.

Response
As a result of the accident, JNR changed its operational policy from "do not stop trains unless absolutely necessary" to "stop trains as soon as an accident happens regardless of its scale."  An Automatic train stop system to stop trains automatically if they should pass a red signal was introduced to all JNR lines by April 1966.

References

Multiple train collision at Mikawashima

External links
 British Pathe news footage of the accident aftermath 
 

Railway accidents in 1962
Derailments in Japan
Jōban Line
Disasters in Tokyo
Rail transport in Tokyo
1962 in Japan
1962 in Tokyo
Accidents and incidents involving Japanese National Railways
May 1962 events in Asia
1962 disasters in Japan

ko:츠루미 사고